The 2019 CONMEBOL Copa América de Futsal was going to be the 13th edition of the Copa América de Futsal, the international futsal championship under FIFA rules organised by CONMEBOL for the men's national teams of South America. The tournament was originally to be held in Los Ángeles, Chile between 23–30 October 2019. However, on 22 October 2019, one day before the start of the tournament, CONMEBOL announced that it was cancelled due to the Chilean protests. Due to cancellation the tournament, leaving the hosting rights for the 2021 Copa América de Futsal with Chile.

Brazil were the defending champions.

Teams
All ten CONMEBOL member national teams entered the tournament.

Venues
The matches were originally to be played at the Polideportivo de Los Ángeles in Los Ángeles.

Draw
The draw of the tournament was held on 26 September 2019, 12:30 CLST (UTC−3), at the Hotel Four Points at Los Ángeles, Chile. The ten teams were drawn into two groups of five. The hosts, Chile, and the title holders, Brazil, were seeded in Groups A and B respectively, while the other eight teams were divided into four pots based on their results in the 2017 Copa América de Futsal, and were drawn to the remaining group positions.

Squads

Each team has to submit a squad of 14 players, including a minimum of two goalkeepers.

Group stage
The top two teams of each group advance to the semi-finals.

Tiebreakers
The ranking of teams in the first stage is determined as follows:
 Points obtained in all group matches (three points for a win, one for a draw, none for a defeat);
 Goal difference in all group matches;
 Number of goals scored in all group matches;
 Points obtained in the matches played between the teams in question;
 Goal difference in the matches played between the teams in question;
 Number of goals scored in the matches played between the teams in question;
 Fair play points in all group matches (only one deduction could be applied to a player in a single match): 
 Drawing of lots.

All times local, CLST (UTC−3).

Group A

Group B

Knockout stage
In the knockout stage, extra time and penalty shoot-out would be used to decide the winner if necessary (no extra time would be used in the play-offs for third to tenth place).

Bracket

Ninth place play-off

Semi-finals
Note: If the hosts Chile qualify for the semi-finals, they will play in the second semi-final.

Seventh place play-off

Fifth place play-off

Third place play-off

Final

References

External links
Copa América Futsal Chile 2019, CONMEBOL.com

2019
2019 in South American futsal
2019 in Chilean football
October 2019 sports events in South America
2019 Copa America Futsal
Cancelled sports events